Nico Lansdorp (4 April 1885 – 18 January 1968) was a Dutch architect. His work was part of the architecture event in the art competition at the 1924 Summer Olympics.

References

1885 births
1968 deaths
19th-century Dutch architects
20th-century Dutch architects
Olympic competitors in art competitions
Architects from Amsterdam